Golbadan Baji or Gulbadan Khanum, also known by her title Khazen ol-Dowleh was a concubine and later wife of Fath-Ali Shah Qajar of Persia (r. 1797–1834). Of Georgian origin, she was originally a slave girl of Fath-Ali Shah's mother after whose death she rose to prominence.

Biography
Fath-Ali Shah's mother Mahd-e Olya Asiye Khanum Ezzeddin Qajar had been responsible for running the Qajar harem household until her death. When she died, Fath-Ali Shah's wives were unable to choose a new head of the royal harem, and therefore requested Fath-Ali Shah to leave Golbadan Baji in charge of the household as she was reportedly familiar with the ways of her mistress. By choosing a concubine, Fath-Ali Shah's wives protected themselves from the perception of favouring one wife over another. Golbadan Baji therefore became head of the household pursestrings. According to contemporaneous sources, she fulfilled this task efficiently and with fidelity. Fath-Ali Shah was very impressed by Golbadan Baji's performance, and therefore married her as a sigheh, and gave her the honorific title (laqab) Khazen-ol-Dowleh.

Even after marrying and giving birth to two sons (Fath-Ali Shah's 37th son Bahman Mirza Baha-ol-Dowleh; and his 42nd son Seyfollah Mirza) she still managed the harem's affairs and expenditures efficiently. According to contemporaneous sources, at Nowruz (the Iranian New Year), she chose gifts for the harem's residents, princes and notables including the governors of Iran's provinces. Golbadan Baji kept a detailed list of all expenditures and presents. She was well trusted by many inside and outside the harem. At the height of her influence, Golbadan Baji presided over the private treasury, the harem finances and the Shah's private funds whilst heading a host of women secretaries and accountants.

References

Sources
 
 
 
 

18th-century births
19th-century deaths
Iranian people of Georgian descent
19th-century Iranian women
Qajar royal consorts
Slave concubines
19th-century slaves